Lençóis may refer to:
Lençóis, Bahia, Brazil
Lençóis Paulista, São Paulo, Brazil
Lençóis Maranhenses National Park, Maranhão, Brazil